VC Baku is an Azerbaijani women's volleyball club.

History
VC Baku women volleyball team was founded in 2010. VC Baku participated at Azerbaijan Women's Volleyball Super League 2010-2011 season and finished 6th. The team will enter CEV Challenge Cup this season.

References

Azerbaijani volleyball clubs
Volleyball clubs established in 2010
2010 establishments in Azerbaijan
Sports teams in Baku